Euriphene excelsior is a butterfly in the family Nymphalidae. It is found in the Democratic Republic of the Congo (Kivu and Uele), Uganda, Rwanda and Burundi.

References

Butterflies described in 1911
Euriphene